Vincent "Vince" Allen (born May 13, 1955) is a former gridiron football running back who played for the Hamilton Tiger-Cats of the Canadian Football League. He played in three games during the 1978 CFL season. He played college football at Indiana State University for the Sycamores.

Early career 

Allen attended Richmond High School and went on to play college football for the Indiana State Sycamores.

Professional career 

In the middle of the 1978 season, running back Jimmy Edwards of the Hamilton Tiger-Cats suffered a foot injury that forced him to miss multiple games. Allen was signed by the Tiger-Cats to replace Edwards in the starting lineup, but commentators expected him to be cut or face a minimal role after Edwards recovered. Allen played three regular season games with the Tiger-Cats, rushing for 145 yards on 34 carries, including for one touchdown. He also played a role in the passing game, making six catches for 78 yards. As a return specialist, Allen contributed 10 punt returns and four kick returns. He found some success returning punts and kicks, including a 35-yard punt return, but the Tiger-Cats did not retain him as an active player to continue in this role.

Allen was signed by the Ottawa Rough Riders for 1979, and he played in the preseason. He proved productive as a receiver in the preseason, including five catches for 48 yards against the Montreal Alouettes, and he was reported to make a "favorable impression" on the coaching staff. Despite this, he was cut from the roster before the start of the regular season. In late July 1979, cornerback Mike Nelms of the Rough Riders sprained his ankle, and Allen was re-signed to the roster to return punts. He never played in a game for the Rough Riders.

References 

Living people
1955 births
American football halfbacks
Canadian football running backs
Indiana State Sycamores football players
Hamilton Tiger-Cats players
Ottawa Rough Riders players
Players of American football from Indiana
Players of Canadian football from Indiana
Sportspeople from Richmond, Indiana